A falsism is a claim that is clearly and self-evidently wrong. A falsism is usually used merely as a reminder or as a rhetorical or literary device. An example is "pigs can fly". It is the opposite of a truism. A falsism is similar to, though not the same as, a fallacy.

See also
 Absurdity (logic)
 Straw Man argument
 Ad Hominem fallacy
 Slippery Slope fallacy

References 

Informal fallacies
Rhetoric
Communication of falsehoods